The women's lightweight quadruple sculls competition at the 2018 Asian Games was held on 19–23 August at the JSC Lake.

Schedule 
All times are Western Indonesia Time (UTC+07:00)

Results

Heats 
 Qualification: 1 → Final A (FA), 2–4 → Repechage (R)

Heat 1

Heat 2

Repechage
 Qualification: 1–4 → Final A (FA)

Final

References

External links
Rowing at the 2018 Asian Games

Rowing at the 2018 Asian Games